Dadivank or Khutavank is an Armenian Apostolic monastery in the Kalbajar District of Azerbaijan bordering the Martakert Province of the self-proclaimed Republic of Artsakh. It was built between the 9th and 13th centuries and is one of the main monastic complexes of medieval Armenia.

In Azerbaijan, the monastery is called Dadivəng or Xudavəng. The state denies the monastery's Armenian Apostolic heritage, instead referring to it as "Caucasian Albanian."

History and architecture 
The monastery is said to have been founded by St. Dadi, a disciple of Thaddeus the Apostle who spread Christianity in Eastern Armenia during the first century AD. However, the monastery is only first mentioned in the 9th century. In July 2007, the grave said to belong to  St. Dadi was discovered under the holy altar of the main church. The princes of Upper Khachen are also buried at Dadivank, under the church's gavit (narthex).

The monastery belongs to the Diocese of Artsakh of the Armenian Apostolic Church, and consists of the cathedral church of Surb Astvatsatsin (Holy Mother of God), the chapel, and a few other buildings. The main church has Armenian script engraved into its walls, in addition to several 13th-century frescoes. The bas-relief on the south facade of the cathedral at Dadivank, built in 1214, shows the princess offering the church in memory of her sons. According to Paolo Cuneo, Dadivank is one of two monasteries along with Gandzasar where bust motifs (possibly the donors of the monasteries) can be found. British art historian Anthony Eastmond considers the construction of Dadivank to be an example of female church patronage in the Armenian world of the 13th century.

Modern period 
In 1994, following the end of the First Nagorno-Karabakh War, the monastery resumed service, and in 2004, a renovation process began with funding from Armenian-American businesswoman Edele Hovnanian, ending in 2005. The restoration efforts restored the cathedral, along with a chapel which was restored by Edik Abrahamian, an Iranian-Armenian from Tehran.

On 8 October 2001, a motion was proposed at the Parliamentary Assembly of the Council of Europe at the behest of sixteen parliamentary members on the "Maintenance of historical and cultural heritage in the Nagorno-Karabakh Republic." The motion cited as an example "the destruction of Zar (Tsar) monuments in the Kelbajar region, Dadivank, which the local Muslim population regarded as remnants of the Armenian Christian religion and ruined the monastery as it could".

In August 2017, Italian specialists who had previously conducted restoration operations at Davidank returned to continue their cleaning and restoration of the monastery. They had already restored the four chapels and their frescoes and were planning to restore inscriptions and ornaments near the doors to the chapels. The entire restoration project was planned to be completed by 2020.

2020 war and current status 
In the aftermath of the Nagorno-Karabakh war in 2020, which resulted in a ceasefire agreement stipulating the withdrawal of Armenian forces from Kalbajar District and its return to Azerbaijan, the monastery was included in the territory to come under Azerbaijani control. The abbot of the Dadivank Monastery made the decision to transport the monastery's relics of significance, including bells, crosses, and khachkars, to Armenia for protection from destruction by the Azerbaijani government. Azerbaijan called it an "illegal activity" and added that it would take action to enforce legal procedures.

On 28 November 2020, the Azerbaijani Ministry of Defence released footage from inside the monastery. On 4 December 2020, representatives of the Udi community of Azerbaijan visited the monastery and performed a prayer inside. The next day, Rafik Danakari, the deputy chairman of the Udi Christian Orthodox community, was appointed preacher at the monastery.

A sale-exhibition From Dadivank to Yerevan was held on 16 December at the Museum of Folk Art in the Armenian capital. After the withdrawal of Armenian forces from the region, the monastery was placed under the protection of the Russian peacekeeping forces.  In late December additional Armenian clergymen arrived at the monastery and the first wedding ceremony was performed after the war, under the protection of Russian peacekeepers.

Gallery

See also 
 Armenian architecture
 Armenian cultural heritage in Azerbaijan
 Christianity in Azerbaijan
 Culture of Artsakh

Books 
 (in French) Le Petit Futé Arménie, Dominique Auzias, Jean-Paul Labourdette – 2009 – 330 pages
 Armenologie in Deutschland, Armenuhi Drost-Abgarjan, Hermann Goltz – 2005 – p. 59
 (in Italian) Documenti di architettura armena, Alexandr L. Jakobson – 1986 – p. 73

References

External links 

 Dadivank Monastery
 Dadivank Gallery
 Recent Historical-Architectural Research on Dadivank
 Gandzasar.com: Pilgrimage and Tourism, Nagorno Karabakh Republic
 Dadivank Monastery at wikimapia.org
 Program about Dadi Monastery by Vem Radio

Armenian culture
Armenian buildings in Azerbaijan
Armenian Apostolic Church
Armenian Apostolic churches
Armenian Apostolic monasteries
Armenian Apostolic monasteries in Azerbaijan
Churches in Azerbaijan
Christian monasteries in Azerbaijan
Oriental Orthodox congregations established in the 9th century
Christian monasteries established in the 9th century
Kalbajar District